Davey Pattison (born November 18, 1945 in Scotland) is a San Francisco Bay Area based rock vocalist.  Pattison recorded his first music in 1969, and his career took off after arrival in the United States in 1979, on invitation from Bill Graham, to front the band Gamma, formed by Bay Area guitarist Ronnie Montrose.

"I'd given up all hope of finding a quality singer for Gamma until I heard Davey Pattison", according to Montrose. In 1986, Pattison began singing for the first time with guitarist Robin Trower.

After several albums with Trower, Pattison rejoined Montrose in 1992.  Since then, Pattison has performed as a solo artist and has also reunited with Trower for the Robin Trower Band's 2005 album, Another Days Blues.

In 2004, Pattison joined with legendary guitar player Michael Schenker to form the Schenker-Pattison Summit, along with Aynsley Dunbar, one of rock's most well known drummers and bassist Gunter Nezhoda to record The Endless Jam. They followed up with The Endless Jam Continues in 2005 with Tim Bogert on bass.

Pattison toured during the summer of 2008 and fall of 2010 in Europe with the Robin Trower Band, and toured the United States with Trower in 2011.

In 2013 Pattison re-formed Gamma with drummer Dan Buch (Butch), Van Spragins on bass, Tommy Merry on guitar and Brad Barth on keyboards. Pattison is performing hits from Gamma, Robin Tower and Schenker-Pattison Summit.

Personal life
Pattison currently lives in California, in a small town near San Francisco.

Discography
 Kid Gloves – Kid Gloves, featuring former members of Peter Frampton's band, The Herd. (1972)
 Gamma 1 (1979)
 Gamma 2 (1980)
 Tom Coster – T.C. (1981) (2 songs)
 Gamma 3 (1982)
 Robin Trower – Passion  (1987)
 Robin Trower – Take What You Need (1988)
 Robin Trower – In the Line of Fire (1990)
 Ronnie Montrose – The Diva Station (1990)
 L.A. Blues Authority – L.A. Blues Authority (1992)
 Davey Pattison – Mississippi Nights (1999)
 Gamma 4 (2000)
 Original Cast – Leonardo: The Absolute Man (2001)
 Pete Sears – Long Haul (2001)
 Davey Pattison – Pictures (2003)
 Robin Trower – Living Out of Time (2003)
 Schenker-Pattison Summit – The Endless Jam (2004) with guitarist Michael Schenker
 Schenker-Pattison Summit – The Endless Jam Continues (2005)
 Robin Trower – Another Days Blues (2005)
 Robin Trower – Living Out of Time: Live (2005)
 Robin Trower – RT @ RO 08 (2009)
 Robin Trower – The Playful Heart (2010)
 Ronnie Montrose – 10x10 (2017)

References

External links 
 DaveyPattison.com – Davey Pattison / Gamma  homepage (Archive link from 2018)
 Davey Pattison discography & credits at Discogs
 

1945 births
Living people
Musicians from Glasgow
Scottish expatriates in the United States
Scottish rock singers
20th-century Scottish male singers
British blues singers
Blues rock musicians
Scottish Christians
Gamma (band) members
21st-century Scottish male singers